Muhammad Arslan Qadir known as Arslan Qadir (born 5 February 1994) is a Pakistani field hockey player.

Background and family
Qadir belongs to Dera Ghazi Khan. His brother, Faisal has also represented Pakistan in hockey.

Career

2010
At the Youth Olympics held in Singapore, Qadir emerged the joint top goal scorer with 10 goals and helped the team win a silver medal.

2013
Qadir made his senior debut during the Australian tour just before the Asian Champions Trophy in Japan. He was part of the 2013 Junior World Cup.

2014
Qadir was part of the team at the 2014 Champions Trophy held in Bhubaneswar, India. His 2 goals in the semi-final win over India earned him the man of the match award. Before the Champions Trophy, Qadir had earned 46 international caps.

References

1994 births
Living people
Pakistani male field hockey players
People from Dera Ghazi Khan District
Field hockey players from Punjab, Pakistan
Field hockey players at the 2010 Summer Youth Olympics
2018 Men's Hockey World Cup players
21st-century Pakistani people